The 2015 season of Clube Desportivo Primeiro de Agosto is the club's 37th season in the Girabola, the Angolan Premier football League and 37th consecutive season in the top flight of Angolan football. In 2015, the club participated in the Girabola and the Angola Cup.

Squad information
The players are:

Players

Staff

Pre-season transfers

Mid-season transfers

Overview

Angolan League
League outcomes:

League table

Match details
Match outcomes:

Results

Results by round

Results overview

Results summary

Angola Cup

Round of 16

Season statistics

Appearances and goals

|-
! colspan="10" style="background:#DCDCDC; text-align:center" | Goalkeepers

|-
! colspan="10" style="background:#DCDCDC; text-align:center" | Defenders

|-
! colspan="10" style="background:#DCDCDC; text-align:center" | Midfielders

|-
! colspan="10" style="background:#DCDCDC; text-align:center" | Forwards

|-
! colspan=13 style=background:#DCDCDC; text-align:center| Opponents

|-
! colspan="15" style="background:#DCDCDC; text-align:center" | Total

Scorers

Clean sheets

Season progress

See also
 List of C.D. Primeiro de Agosto players

References

External links
 Match details
 Zerozero.pt profile

C.D. Primeiro de Agosto seasons
Primeiro de Agosto